The Main Frontal Thrust (MFT), also known as the Himalayan Frontal Thrust (HFT) is a geological fault in the Himalayas that defines the boundary between the  Himalayan foothills and Indo-Gangetic Plain. The fault is well expressed on the surface thus could be seen via satellite imagery. It is the youngest and southernmost thrust structure in the Himalaya deformation front. It is a splay branch of the Main Himalayan Thrust (MHT) as the root décollement. 

It runs parallel to other major splays of the MHT; Main Boundary Thrust (MBT) and Main Central Thrust (MCT). The Sunda Megathrust, which extends from the Banda Islands to Myanmar is joined with the MFT. The fault strikes in a NW-SE direction and dips at an angle of 20° to 30° in the north.

Main Boundary Thrust 
The Main Boundary Thrust (MBT) is another major thrust fault in the Himalaya orogenic wedge that was active in the Cenozoic. It runs parallel to the MFT with a spacing distance of about 20 km.

Shortening rate 
Shortening rate varies across the MFT, these figures provide the speed in various locations.

Seismic activity 
The MFT accommodates almost the entire rate of subduction of the Indian Plate therefore, it is no surprise that numerous earthquakes have occurred along this fault, and is expected to produce very big earthquakes in the future. Many earthquakes associated with the MFT has resulted in visible ground ruptures, as seen in the Bihar earthquake of 1934 and 1505 magnitude 8.2-8.8 earthquake.

Reference 

Tectonics
Himalayas
Active faults
Structural geology
Seismic faults
Seismic faults of Asia
Thrust faults
Seismic faults of Pakistan
Geology of the Himalaya
Subduction zones
Geology of Asia
Geology of Nepal
Geology of Pakistan
Geology of India
Geology of China
Geology of Bhutan